Ceratozamia miqueliana is a species of plant in the family Zamiaceae. It is endemic to Chiapas and Veracruz, Mexico. It is currently found in Coatzacoalcos and Santiago Tuxtla. Its natural habitat is subtropical or tropical moist lowland forests. It is threatened by habitat loss.

References

miqueliana
Endemic flora of Mexico
Flora of Chiapas
Flora of Veracruz
Vulnerable plants
Endangered biota of Mexico
Taxonomy articles created by Polbot